Luis Vicente Palomino (born October 9, 1980) is a Peruvian-American mixed martial artist and bare-knuckle fighter who is the current Lightweight and Welterweight champion for Bare Knuckle Fighting Championship, making him the first “double champ” in the BKFC. He also competed in the Lightweight division for the World Series of Fighting and Absolute Championship Berkut. In addition, he previously fought in the featherweight division.

In 2009, Palomino fought for Bellator Fighting Championships, where he competed in their Featherweight Tournament.

Mixed martial arts career

Early career
Palomino began his career with 3–0 record, in the Absolute Fighting Championship promotion, one of which being a victory over future The Ultimate Fighter 7 competitor Jeremy May via unanimous decision.

Palomino's next six fights ended via KO/TKO, whether he won or lost. During this stretch, Palomino had a record of 4–2.

In his final fight prior to joining Bellator, Palomino fought John Mahlow for the XFC Lightweight Championship, in a bout that was featured on the Inside MMA show. Palomino lost the fight via submission (rear naked choke) in the fifth round.

Bellator Fighting Championships
Palomino then joined Bellator to take part in their Bellator Season One: Featherweight Tournament. His opening round fight was against Estevan Payan at Bellator 1. Palomino was knocked down by Payan and almost submitted with a rear naked choke in the first round, but time expired before Payan could finish the fight. The next two rounds were regarded as difficult to score and this led to the verdict of a split decision (29–28, 28–29, 29–28) which didn't go Palomino's way.

Despite his elimination from the featherweight tournament, Palomino stayed with the Bellator promotion and continued in the featherweight division. His opponent at Bellator 6 was Nick Gonzalez and Palomino defeated him via TKO (punches) in the second minute of the first round.

Palomino next faced Troy Gerhart at Bellator 12 in a 150 lb bout and defeated him via unanimous decision (29–28, 29–28, 29–28).

After the first season of Bellator ended, Palomino took a few fights outside of the promotion. Palomino lost his first fight to eventual The Ultimate Fighter winner Jonathan Brookins via submission (rear naked choke) in the second round. Palomino followed the loss up with two victories including wins over Rafael Dias by TKO and Jorge Masvidal via split decision.

In his next Bellator appearance at Bellator 21, Palomino defeated Jose Figueroa via unanimous decision in a lightweight bout.

Palomino then stayed with Bellator into the third season. His first fight of the season was against Yves Edwards at Bellator 24, which he lost via unanimous decision.

Championship Fighting Alliance
Palomino signed with local promotion Championship Fighting Alliance, Palomino quickly made his CFA debut on May 6, 2012 in Miami, Florida against Peter Grimes for the inaugural CFA Featherweight championship at CFA's inaugural event; CFA: The Title. Palomino defeated Grimes by submission due to an armbar at 4:59 of round 4.

Palomino returned at CFA 04: Izquierdo vs. Cenoble on December 17, 2011 in Coral Gables, Florida against well known journeyman Charles Bennett. Palomino was able to use his speed advantage to counter punch the aggressive Bennett and ultimately knocked Bennett out at 3:59 of the first round. Palomino became only the second man to knock Bennet out.

Palomino was scheduled to fight former Maximum Fighting Championship Lightweight Champion Antonio McKee at CFA 06 on April 13, 2012 in Coral Gables, Florida. McKee was forced off the card due to an injury and was replaced by James Warfield, the fight was originally scheduled for the CFA Lightweight Championship but Warfield did not make the required weight of 155 pounds thus rescheduling the fight to a non-title bout. Warfield knocked Palomino down in the first round but Palomino was able to recover and control the rest of his fight by using his unorthodox and fast striking to pick Warfield thus winning by unanimous decision.

Palomino next faced 2x Hero's Grand Prix winner and Strikeforce veteran Gesias Cavalcante at CFA 07: Never Give Up on June 30, 2012 in Coral Gables, Florida. Palomino became the first man to ever finish Cavalcante and he did so via third-round knockout due to punches.

Palomino returned to action at CFA 09 on January 19, 2013 when he faced PRIDE veteran Luiz Firmino for the CFA Lightweight Championship, Palomino lost a unanimous decision after being constantly outgrappled and taken down throughout the fight.

Palomino bounced back from his previous defeat on May 24, 2013 at CFA 11 by knocking out Robert Washington in the first round.

Palomino faced The Ultimate Fighter 8 winner Efrain Escudero at CFA 12 on October 12, 2013. He lost the bout via unanimous decision.

World Series of Fighting
Palomino made his WSOF debut on January 18, 2014 in Hollywood, Florida against Jorge Patino, Palomino won via second-round knockout.

Palomino faced champion Justin Gaethje for the WSOF Lightweight Championship at WSOF 19 on March 28, 2015. He lost the back-and-forth fight via TKO in the third round.

Palomino faced Gaethje in a rematch on September 18, 2015 at WSOF 23.  It was again a back-and-forth battle that Palomino lost via TKO in the second round.

Palomino next entered WSOF's one night Lightweight tournament to determine the number one contender for the Lightweight Championship.  He faced Rich Patishnock in the quarter finals and won via knockout in the first round.  He then faced Brian Foster in the semifinals and lost via TKO in the second round.

Absolute Championship Berkut
Palomino faced Chechen fighter Musa Khamanaev on January 13, 2017 at ACB 51. He won the fight via TKO in the second round.

In the second fight he faced Marcos Vinicius Schmitz on May 20, 2017 at ACB 61. He won the fight via unanimous decision.

Palomino faced Yusuf Raisov on August 19, 2017 at ACB 67. He lost the fight via unanimous decision.

Bare-knuckle boxing
After signing a three-fight contract with the BKFC, Palomino made his debut in bare-knuckle boxing against Elvin Brito at BKFC 10 on February 15, 2020. Palomino won the fight via unanimous decision and advanced to the four-man BKFC Super Welterweight Tournament finals.

Palomino was initially scheduled to face Jim Alers at BKFC 11 on March 14, 2020 for the Lightweight Championship, but the event was postponed to take place on June 20, 2020 due to the COVID-19 pandemic. The event was subsequently postponed yet again and two weeks before the re-scheduled date July 24, 2020, Alers withdrew after his camp member tested positive for COVID-19 and was replaced by Isaac Vallie-Flagg. Palomino claimed the title via first-minute knockout.

The bout with Alers was then rebooked to take place at BKFC 14 on November 13, 2020. Palomino successfully defended his championship via first-minute knockout.

In his second title defense attempt, Palomino faced Tyler Goodjohn at BKFC 18 on June 26, 2021. Palomino retained his title and won the bout via unanimous decision.

He next faced Dat Nguyen at BKFC 22 on November 12, 2021. He successfully defended the title via unanimous decision.

He successfully defended his title by defeating Martin Brown at BKFC: KnuckleMania 2 on February 19, 2022 via unanimous decision.

Following his routing of Brown, Palomino set his sights on becoming the first two-division champion in the BKFC. He faced off against welterweight champion Elvin Brito at BKFC 26 on June 24, 2022–a bout he won by unanimous decision.

Championships and accomplishments

Mixed martial arts
Xtreme Fighting Championships
XFC Featherweight Championship (One time)
Championship Fighting Alliance
Championship Fighting Alliance Featherweight Championship (One time; First)
2012 Championship Fighting Alliance Most Valuable Fighter
Knockout of the Night (Two times) vs. Gesias Cavalcante on June 30, 2012 and vs. Charles Bennett on December 17, 2011
MMAJunkie.com
2015 March Fight of the Month vs. Justin Gaethje
2015 September Fight of the Month vs. Justin Gaethje
Yahoo! Sports
2015 Best Fight of the Half-Year vs. Justin Gaethje

Bare-knuckle boxing
Bare Knuckle Fighting Championship
BKFC Lightweight Championship (one time; current; first)
Three successful title defenses
Police Gazette World Lightweight Championship

Brazilian Jiu-Jitsu
Promoted to black belt on April 25, 2012 by Daniel Valverde

Mixed martial arts record

|-
| Loss
| align=center| 26–17
| Claudio Quintana
| Decision (unanimous)
| ONE Fight Night: Quintana vs. Palomino
| 
| align=center| 3
| align=center| 5:00
| Santiago, Chile
|
|-
| Loss
| align=center| 26–16
| Apti Bimarzaev
| Decision (unanimous)
| ACA 93: Balaev vs Zhamaldaev 
| 
| align=center| 3
| align=center| 5:00
| St. Petersburg, Russia
|
|-
| Loss
|align=center|26–15
| Lom-Ali Eskijew
|Decision (unanimous)
| ACB 84: Agujev vs. Burrell 
| 
| align=center| 3
| align=center| 5:00
| Bratislava, Slovakia
|
|-
| Loss
|align=center|26–14
| Yusuf Raisov
|Decision (unanimous)
| ACB 67: Cooper vs. Berkhamov
| 
| align=center| 3
| align=center| 5:00
| Grozny, Chechnya, Russia
|
|-
|Win
|align=center|26–13
| Marcos Vinicius Schmitz
| Decision (unanimous)
| ACB 61: Balaev vs. Bataev
| 
| align=center| 3
| align=center| 5:00
| Saint Petersburg, Leningrad, Russia
|
|-
|Win
|align=center|25–13
| Musa Khamanaev
| TKO (punches)
| ACB 51: Silva vs. Torgeson
| 
| align=center| 2
| align=center| 3:35
| Irvine, California, United States
|
|-
|Loss
|align=center|24–13
|Sheymon Moraes
|Decision (unanimous)
|WSOF 31: Ivanov vs. Copeland
|
|align=center|3
|align=center|5:00
|Mashantucket, Connecticut, United States
|
|-
|Loss
|align=center|24–12
|Brian Foster
|TKO (punches)
| rowspan=2|WSOF 25: Lightweight Tournament
| rowspan=2|
|align=center|2
|align=center|4:19
| rowspan=2|Phoenix, Arizona, United States
|
|-
|Win
|align=center|24–11
|Rich Patishnock
|KO (punch)
|align=center|1
|align=center|4:55
|
|-
|Loss
|align=center|23–11
|Justin Gaethje
|TKO (punches)
|WSOF 23: Gaethje vs. Palomino 2
|
|align=center|2
|align=center|4:30
|Phoenix, Arizona, United States
|
|-
|Loss
|align=center|23–10
|Justin Gaethje
|TKO (leg kicks and punches)
|WSOF 19: Gaethje vs. Palomino
|
|align=center|3
|align=center|3:57
|Phoenix, Arizona, United States
|
|-
|-
|Win
|align=center|23–9
|Lewis Gonzalez
|KO (head kick)
|WSOF 12: Palomino vs Gonzalez
|
|align=center|1
|align=center|4:42
|Las Vegas, Nevada, United States
|
|-
|Win
|align=center|22–9
|Jorge Patino
|KO (punches)
|WSOF 8: Gaethje vs. Patishnock
|
|align=center|2
|align=center|4:20
|Hollywood, Florida, United States
|
|-
|Loss
|align=center|21–9
|Efrain Escudero
|Decision (unanimous)
|CFA 12: Sampo vs. Thao
|
|align=center|3
|align=center|5:00
|Coral Gables, Florida, United States
|
|-
|Win
|align=center|21–8
|Robert Washington
|KO (punch)
|CFA 11: Kyle vs. Wiuff 2
|
|align=center|1
|align=center|3:23
|Coral Gables, Florida, United States
|CFA Lightweight Title Eliminator
|-
|Loss
|align=center|20–8
|Luiz Firmino
|Decision (unanimous)
|CFA 09: Night of Champions
|
|align=center|5
|align=center|5:00
|Coral Gables, Florida, United States
|<small>For the CFA Lightweight Championship
|-
|Win
|align=center|20–7
|Gesias Cavalcante
|KO (punches)
|CFA 07: Never Give Up
|
|align=center|3
|align=center|1:41
|Coral Gables, Florida, United States
|
|-
|Win
|align=center|19–7
|James Warfield
|Decision (unanimous)
|CFA 06: Palomino vs. Warfield
|
|align=center|3
|align=center|5:00
|Coral Gables, Florida, United States
|Catchweight at 158 lb, originally for the CFA Lightweight Championship; Warfield weighed in at 158 lb, 3 pounds over the 155 lb limit
|-
|Win
|align=center|18–7
|Charles Bennett
|KO (punch)
|CFA 04: Izquierdo vs. Cenoble
|
|align=center|1
|align=center|3:59
|Coral Gables, Florida, United States
|
|-
|Win
|align=center|17–7
|James Edson Berto
|Decision (unanimous)
|W-1 MMA: Reloaded
|
|align=center|3
|align=center|5:00
|Miami, Florida, United States
|
|-
|Loss
|align=center|16–7
|Pat Curran
|Submission (Peruvian necktie)
|Bellator 46
|
|align=center|1
|align=center|3:49
|Miami, Florida, United States
|Bellator Featherweight Tournament Quarterfinals
|-
|Win
|align=center|16–6
|Peter Grimes
|Submission (armbar)
|Championship Fighting Alliance: The Title
|
|align=center|4
|align=center|4:59
|Miami, Florida, United States
|Won the inaugural CFA Featherweight Championship
|-
|Win
|align=center|15–6
|Daron Cruickshank
|KO (head kick and punches)
|G-Force Fights: Bad Blood 5
|
|align=center|1
|align=center|3:52
|Grand Rapids, Michigan, United States
|
|-
|Win
|align=center|14–6
|Jarrod Card
|Decision (unanimous)
|XFC 13: Unstoppable
|
|align=center|5
|align=center|5:00
|Tampa, Florida, United States
|Won XFC Featherweight Title
|-
|Loss
|align=center|13–6
|Yves Edwards
|Decision (unanimous)
|Bellator 24
|
|align=center|3
|align=center|5:00
|Hollywood, Florida, United States
|
|-
|Win
|align=center|13–5
|Jose Figueroa
|Decision (unanimous)
|Bellator 21
|
|align=center|3
|align=center|5:00
|Hollywood, Florida, United States
|
|-
|Win
|align=center|12–5
|Jorge Masvidal
|Decision (split)
|G-Force Fights: Bad Blood 3
|
|align=center|3
|align=center|5:00
|Miami, Florida, United States
|
|-
|Win
|align=center|11–5
|Rafael Dias
|TKO (punches)
|Unconquered 1: November Reign
|
|align=center|3
|align=center|4:47
|Coral Gables, Florida, United States
|
|-
|Loss
|align=center|10–5
|Jonathan Brookins
|Submission (rear-naked choke)
|G-Force Fights: Bad Blood 2
|
|align=center|2
|align=center|1:44
|Coral Gables, Florida, United States
|
|-
|Win
|align=center|10–4
|Troy Gerhart
|Decision (unanimous)
|Bellator 12
|
|align=center|3
|align=center|5:00
|Hollywood, Florida, United States
|
|-
|Win
|align=center|9–4
|Nick Gonzalez
|TKO (punches)
|Bellator 6
|
|align=center|1
|align=center|2:13
|Robstown, Texas, United States
|
|-
|Loss
|align=center|8–4
|Estevan Payan
|Decision (split)
|Bellator 1
|
|align=center|3
|align=center|5:00
|Hollywood, Florida, United States
|Bellator Featherweight Tournament Opening Round
|-
|Loss
|align=center|8–3
|John Mahlow
|Submission (rear-naked choke)
|XFC 6: Clash of the Continents
|
|align=center|5
|align=center|1:57
|Tampa, Florida, United States
|For the XFC Lightweight Championship
|-
|Win
|align=center|8–2
|Marc Stevens
|Decision (unanimous)
|United States Fight League: War in the Woods 5
|
|align=center|3
|align=center|5:00
|Ledyard, Connecticut, United States
|
|-
|Win
|align=center|7–2
|Eric Reynolds
|KO (punch)
|G-Force Fights: Bad Blood 1
|
|align=center|1
|align=center|0:38
|Miami, Florida, United States
|
|-
|Win
|align=center|6–2
|Andrew Carron
|TKO (punches)
|United States Fight League: War in the Woods 4
|
|align=center|1
|align=center|0:57
|Ledyard, Connecticut, United States
|
|-
|Loss
|align=center|5–2
|Mike Bernhard
|TKO (punches)
|Premier X-treme Fighting 
|
|align=center|2
|align=center|4:01
|Hollywood, Florida, United States
|
|-
|Win
|align=center|5–1
|Patrick Mikesz
|KO (punches)
|RIC: Cage Fighting Championships  
|
|align=center|1
|align=center|1:10
|Ft. Lauderdale, Florida, United States
|
|-
|Win
|align=center|4–1
|Steve Conley
|TKO (punches)
|PFL: Genesis 
|
|align=center|1
|align=center|2:33
|Miami, Florida, United States
|
|-
|Loss
|align=center|3–1
|Travis Cox
|TKO (punches)
|World Extreme Fighting 
|
|align=center|1
|align=center|1:08
|Miami, Florida, United States
|
|-
|Win
|align=center|3–0
|Jeremy May
|Decision (unanimous)
|Absolute Fighting Championships 19
|
|align=center|2
|align=center|5:00
|Boca Raton, Florida, United States
|
|-
|Win
|align=center|2–0
|Mike Soltz
|TKO (punches)
|Absolute Fighting Championships 18
|
|align=center|1
|align=center|0:25
|Boca Raton, Florida, United States
|
|-
|Win
|align=center|1–0
|Louis Pilato
|Submission (punches)
|Absolute Fighting Championships 17
|
|align=center|1
|align=center|1:23
|Boca Raton, Florida, United States
|

Bare knuckle record

|-
|Win
|align=center|8–0
|Tom Shoaff
|TKO (doctor stoppage)
|BKFC 34: Hollywood
|
|align=center|4
|align=center|0:01
|Hollywood, Florida, United States
|
|-
|Win
|align=center|7–0
|Elvin Brito		
|Decision (unanimous)
|BKFC 26: Hollywood
|
|align=center|5
|align=center|2:00
|Hollywood, Florida, United States
|
|-
|Win
|align=center|6–0
|Martin Brown
|Decision (unanimous)
|BKFC: KnuckleMania 2
|
|align=center|5
|align=center|2:00
|Miami, Florida, United States
|
|-
|Win
|align=center|5–0
|Dat Nguyen
|Decision (unanimous)
|BKFC 22: Lombard vs. Hunt
| 
|align=center|5
|align=center|2:00
|Miami, Florida, United States
|
|-
|Win
|align=center|4–0
|Tyler Goodjohn
|Decision (unanimous)
|BKFC 18: Beltran vs. Shewmaker
|
|align=center|5
|align=center|2:00
|Miami, Florida, United States
|
|-
|Win
|align=center|3–0
|Jim Alers
|TKO (punches)
|BKFC 14: Palomino vs. Alers
|
|align=center|1
|align=center|0:44
|Miami, Florida, United States
|
|-
|Win
|align=center|2–0
|Isaac Vallie-Flagg
|KO (punches)
|BKFC 11: Palomino vs. Vallie-Flagg
|
|align=center|1
|align=center|0:45
|Oxford, Mississippi, United States
| 
|-
|Win
|align=center|1–0
|Elvin Brito
|Decision (unanimous)
|BKFC 10: Lombard vs. Mundell
|
|align=center|5
|align=center|2:00
|Fort Lauderdale, Florida, United States
|
|-

See also
List of male mixed martial artists
List of current WSOF fighters

References

External links

Living people
1980 births
American practitioners of Brazilian jiu-jitsu
Peruvian practitioners of Brazilian jiu-jitsu
Peruvian male mixed martial artists
American male mixed martial artists
Featherweight mixed martial artists
Lightweight mixed martial artists
Mixed martial artists utilizing capoeira
Mixed martial artists utilizing Brazilian jiu-jitsu
Bare-knuckle boxers 
Peruvian capoeira practitioners
Peruvian emigrants to the United States
People awarded a black belt in Brazilian jiu-jitsu